Oskar (Oscar) Johann Kellner (13 May 1851 - 12 September 1911) was a German agricultural scientist (Agrikulturchemiker, Tierphysiologe).

Biography

Kellner was invited to teach in Japan as a foreign advisor by the Meiji government of the Empire of Japan to improve on Japanese agricultural productivity.

Arriving on 5 November 1881, he taught at the Komaba Agricultural School in Tokyo, and its successor, the Tokyo Agriculture and Forestry School (now a department within Tokyo University), and also conducted research into chemical fertilizers. He is considered the “father” of Japanese agricultural chemistry. His nutritional analysis of livestock feed was called the “Kellner Standard” and was subsequently adopted by the Japanese livestock industry. Kellner returned to Germany on 31 December 1892.

The Kellner rice fields at Komabano Park close to the University of Tokyo Komaba campus, serve as a lasting tribute to his research activities while in Japan.

Works 
 die Ernährung der landwirtschaftlichen Nutztiere, 1905
 Grundzüge der Fütteringslehre, 1907

External links 
 
 from Tokyo University Department of Agricultural Sciences (Japanese)

1851 births
1911 deaths
People from Opole County
German expatriates in Japan
Foreign advisors to the government in Meiji-period Japan
Foreign educators in Japan
Agriculture in Japan
People from the Province of Silesia
German agronomists
Academic staff of the University of Tokyo